An annular solar eclipse occurred on Saturday, November 22, 1919. A solar eclipse occurs when the Moon passes between Earth and the Sun, thereby totally or partly obscuring the image of the Sun for a viewer on Earth. An annular solar eclipse occurs when the Moon's apparent diameter is smaller than the Sun's, blocking most of the Sun's light and causing the Sun to look like an annulus (ring). An annular eclipse appears as a partial eclipse over a region of the Earth thousands of kilometres wide. It occurred in over half of North America, much of South America, a part of Western Europe and about a third of Africa.

Places inside the annular eclipse included North America and the Caribbean, including Austin, San Antonio, Houston and Galveston, Texas in the United States and was close to Mexico at around 7:30 CT (13:30 UTC), more than a quarter of the Gulf of Mexico and close to the Florida Keys in the United States which occurred before 8:45 ET (13:45 UTC), it also included Cuba, most of Haiti and the southwesternmost Dominican Republic , it was almost near Venezuela and it included Saint Vincent and the Grenadines and Barbados which happened in the mid morning hours.  The greatest eclipse occurred at 15:14:12 UTC. In Africa, it included the Gambia, southern Senegal including Casamance, Portuguese Guinea (now Guinea-Bissau), the northern part of French Guinea (now Guinea) which occurred before 15:45 (16:45 UTC) and southeasternmost Mauritania and the middle portion of the French Sudan (now Mali) which included Bamako and Timbuktu, it occurred in the late afternoon before sunset at 17:00 UTC.

The duration of annularity at maximum eclipse (closest to but slightly shorter than the longest duration) was 11 minutes, 36.56 seconds in the Atlantic Ocean north of Brazil. It was the longest annular solar eclipse since January 5, 1647, but the Solar eclipse of December 2, 1937 lasted longer.

Related eclipses

Solar eclipses 1916–1920

Saros 141

Inex series

Notes

References

1919 11 22
1919 in science
1919 11 22
November 1919 events